Pepper Records was a record label and subsidiary of Jive Records that featured artists like Shanks & Bigfoot and Steps.  The label has been largely inactive since 2004 after being integrated into major label structures.

See also
 List of record labels

British record labels
Pop record labels
Zomba Group of Companies subsidiaries